Vermiculation is a surface pattern of dense but irregular lines, so called from the Latin vermiculus meaning "little worm" because the shapes resemble worms, worm-casts, or worm tracks in mud or wet sand.  The word may be used in a number of contexts for patterns that have little in common. The adjective vermiculated is more often used than the noun.

Vermiculation naturally occurs in patterns on a wide variety of species, for example in the feathers of certain birds, for which it may provide either camouflage or decoration. Several species are named after this trait, either in English or by the Latin vermicularis.  

It also appears in architecture as a form of rustication where the stone is cut with a pattern of wandering lines. In metalwork, vermiculation is used to form a type of background found in Romanesque enamels, especially on chasse reliquary caskets. In this case the term is used for what is in fact a dense pattern of regular ornament using plant forms and tendrils. In Ancient Roman mosaics, opus vermiculatum was the most detailed technique, and pieces are often described as "vermiculated" in English.

Species named "vermiculated"
Several species of owls are named for their vermiculated patterns
 Vermiculated fishing-owl (Scotopelia bouvieri), an owl species found in Africa
 Vermiculated eagle-owl or greyish eagle-owl (Bubo cinerascens), an owl species
 Vermiculated screech-owl (Megascops guatemalae), an owl species

Other
Vermiculated angelfish, a Chaetodontoplus marine angelfish 
Vermiculate parrotfish
Vermiculate shrew or Xanthippe's shrew (Crocidura xantippe), Africa
Vermiculated tree frog (Leptopelis vermiculatus), Africa
Vermiculated spinefoot (Siganus vermiculatus), also known as Maze Rabbitfish, is a species of rabbitfish

Species named vermicularis
Some species have patterns that look like little worms, others actually are little worms.  Some of these names have now been superseded.
Alcinoe vermicularis, in the Ocyropsidae family of ctenophores 
Alnus vermicularis, an alder tree
Blutaparon vermiculare (or Gomphrena vermicularis, Philoxerus vermicularis), plant in the Americas
Burmagomphus vermicularis, a dragonfly
Chelonistele vermicularis, a species of orchid 
Clavaria vermicularis a fungus
Cobelura vermicularis, a species of longhorn beetles
Dendrolaelaps vermicularis, a mite species
Encheliophis vermicularis, a worm pearlfish species
Enterobius vermicularis, a parasitic nematode, the human threadworm or pinworm 
Entomacrodus vermiculatus, a species of combtooth blenny native to the Indian Ocean
Lacrymaria vermicularis, a ciliate protist species 
Medicago vermicularis, a plant now usually called Medicago coronata
Ophiobatrachus vermicularis, a salamander
Philedone vermicularis, a moth
Pseudanthus vermicularis, Australian plant
Sepia vermicularis, known as the common cuttlefish or ink-fish, endemic to South Africa
Serpula vermicularis, a segmented marine worm
Takifugu vermicularis, the Purple puffer, a species of Asian pufferfish
Thamnolia vermicularis, a fungus species in Australia
Turritella vermicularis, an extinct species of sea snail
Typhlops vermicularis, the European blind snake or European worm snake, no larger than a worm

Other uses
Vermiculate atrophoderma (Atrophodermia vermiculata) a genetic skin disease
A variant form of rustication (architecture)
The rock texture myrmekite is composed of vermicular worm-like intergrowths of quartz and feldspar.

References

Camouflage patterns
Ornaments
Limoges enamel